Augustine Chouchou Ngo Mback Batoum (born 1 July 1997) is a Cameroonian footballer who plays as a left midfielder for Louves Miniproff and the Cameroon women's national team.

Club career
Ngo Mback has played for Louves Miniproff in Cameroon.

International career
Ngo Mback capped for Camerooon at senior level during the 2016 Africa Women Cup of Nations and the 2020 CAF Women's Olympic Qualifying Tournament.

References

1997 births
Living people
Cameroonian women's footballers
Women's association football midfielders
Cameroon women's international footballers
21st-century Cameroonian women
20th-century Cameroonian women